The Electronic Fund Transfer Act was passed by the U.S. Congress in 1978 and signed by President Jimmy Carter, to establish the rights and liabilities of consumers as well as the responsibilities of all participants in electronic funds transfer activities.

The act was implemented in Federal Reserve Board Regulation E.

Rights of consumers
The EFT Act recognizes their right to nominate the financial institution to which such payments are to be made.

The EFT Act also prohibits a creditor or lender from requiring a consumer to repay a loan or other credit by electronic fund transfer, except when there is an overdraft on checking plans.

Financial institution liability
The financial institution must give the customer notice of his liability in case the card is lost or stolen. This must include a phone number for reporting the loss and a description of its error resolution process.

Limit to customer liability on loss or her of card
If a customer reports to the financial institution that a card is missing before any transactions takes place, the cardholder is not held responsible for any transaction that takes place after the report of a missing/stolen card.

A customer can be liable for unauthorized withdrawals if their card is lost or stolen and they do not follow certain criteria:
 
Loss is limited to $50 if the institution is notified within two business days
Loss could be up to $500 if the institution is notified between 3 and 59 days
If the loss is not reported within 60 business days customer risks unlimited loss on transfers made after the 60-day period – could lose all money in the account plus maximum overdraft if any.

EFT errors 
EFT is not a perfect system; therefore customers should still be diligent in reviewing their EFT statements for possible errors as they would with any other type of transaction. Should a customer notice that there has been an error in an electronic fund transfer relating to their account certain steps must be taken:

Under the Act, the customer must:

Write or call the financial institution immediately if possible
Must be no later than 60 days from the date of the erroneous statement
Give their name and account number
Explain why they believe there is an error, the type, dollar amount and date
May be required to send details of the error in writing within 10 business days

Under the Act, the financial institution must:

Promptly investigate the error and resolve it within 45 days
Errors involving new accounts (opened last 30 days), POS transactions, and foreign transactions may take up to 90 days
If it takes more than 10 business days to complete the investigation:
Must recredit the amount in question
For new accounts may take up to 20 business days to recredit the account
Must notify the customer of the results of the investigation:
If there was an error – correct it or make recredit final
If no error – explanation in writing, notify the customer of deducted recredit
Customer has the right to ask for copies of any documents relied on in the investigation

What the EFT Act Covers
The EFT Act does not apply to all pre-authorized plans. The EFT Act does not apply to automatic transfers from any account held in the name of the institution the consumer uses to the account the consumer uses.
An example of this would be where the EFT Act would not apply to any automatic payments put towards a mortgage held by the financial institution where a consumer would hold their electronic fund's account.
The EFT Act would also not apply to automatic transfers among a consumer's account at a specific financial institution.
The EFT Act also does not cover all transfers. Some banks, other financial institutions, and vendors will produce cards with a cash value imprinted into the card itself
Examples of these include public transit passes, store gift cards, and prepaid telephone cards. These cards may not be covered by the EFT Act.
When using electronic funds transfer, the Act does not give the consumer the right to stop payment.
State law or any contract that imposes a lower liability limit than those mentioned in the “Loss or Theft: Customer Liability” will be preempted (overridden) by the federal EFT Act unless the state law provides protections that are greater than that provided under Federal law. (See Section 919 of the Act).

See also
 Electronic funds transfer

References

Further reading
The Federal Reserve Board. (2001). Consumer Handbook to Credit Protection Laws: Electronic Fund Transfers. Retrieved June 26, 2006
Regulation E at www.bankersonline.com
Regulation E at FDIC

 

1978 in American law
United States federal banking legislation
95th United States Congress
1978 in American politics
1978 in economics